Leonid Mironovich Leonidov (– 6 August 1941) was a Russian and Soviet actor, director and pedagogue. People's Artist of the USSR (1936).

Biography
Born Leonid Meyerovich Volfenzon in a Jewish family in Odessa, he worked in the Moscow Art Theatre from 1903. His roles included Dmitri Karamazov, Othello, Lopakhin. In 1920s and 1930s he also appeared in several films. Konstantin Stanislavski called him "the only Russian tragic actor." Leonidov was honored with People's Artist of the USSR in 1936.

Filmography
 The Iron Heel (1919)
The Wings of a Serf (1926)
His Excellency (1927)
 Marionettes (1934)

References

External links

 Leonid Leonidov at Peoples

1873 births
1941 deaths

Actors from Odesa
Academic staff of Moscow Art Theatre School
Honored Artists of the RSFSR
People's Artists of the RSFSR
People's Artists of the USSR
Recipients of the Order of Lenin
Recipients of the Order of the Red Banner of Labour
Male actors from the Russian Empire

Soviet drama teachers
Soviet male film actors
Soviet male silent film actors
Soviet male stage actors
Soviet theatre directors
Burials at Novodevichy Cemetery